James Asmus is a writer, actor and comedian known for his affiliation with such theaters as The Annoyance and the sketch group Hey You Millionaires, and for his work writing comic books such as Quantum and Woody, Thief of Thieves and Gambit.

Career
Asmus has written several plays for both the Annoyance Theater and The New Colony theater group in Chicago. The plays he has written include Love Is Dead (The Annoyance), Hearts Full of Blood (the New Colony) and Amelia Earhart Jungle Princes (The New Colony). Both Love is Dead and Hearts Full of Blood received remounts in the New York Fringe Fest, winning awards for Outstanding Music & Lyrics and Outstanding Achievement in Playwrighting respectively.

Asmus is currently most prolific as a comic book writer, writing such comics as Gambit for Marvel Comics, Thief of Thieves for Image Comics, and Quantum & Woody for Valiant Entertainment.

Awards and nominations
 2008 Fringe NYC Outstanding Music & Lyrics - Love Is Dead: a NecRomantic Musical Comedy
 2008 After Dark Awards' Outstanding Original Score - Love Is Dead: a NecRomantic Musical Comedy
 2009 Chicago Readers' Choice Best Emerging Playwright
 2010 Fringe NYC Overall Excellence in Playwrighting - Hearts Full of Blood
 2014 Stan Lee Excelsior Award - Silver Award, Readers' Favorite Graphic Novel - Quantum & Woody vol. 1 - World's Worst 
 2014 Harvey Awards, 3 Nominations - Best Writer, Most Promising New Talent, and Special Award for Humor in Comics - Quantum & Woody 
 2015 Harvey Awards, 2 Nominations - Special Award for Humor in Comics - Quantum & Woody and The Delinquents

Bibliography

Marvel Comics
X-Men
X-Men: Manifest Destiny #1, 4 (#1 Boom Boom story; #3 Nightcrawler story, 2008)
X-Men: Manifest Destiny - Nightcrawler #1 (with pencils by Jorge Molina and Adrian Syaf, 2008)
Dark X-Men: The Beginning #1 (Mimic story, pencils by Jesse Delperdang, 2009)
Nation X #1 (Nightcrawler & Wolverine story, art by Mike Allred, 2009)
X-Men vs. Vampires #1 (Husk story, art by Tom Raney, 2010)
Wolverine #900 (first story only, with co-writer C. B. Cebulski pencils by David Finch (comics), 2010)
Deadpool Team-Up #890 (pencils by Micah Gunnell, 2010)
X-Men: Serve and Protect #1, 4 (#1 Emma Frost story; #4 Psylocke story, 2010-2011)
Uncanny X-Men Annual #3 (pencils by Nicholas Bradshaw, 2011)
Deadpool Family #1 (Dogpool story, pencils by Darnell Johnson, 2011)
Astonishing X-Men #43 (pencils by David Yardin and Gabriel Hernandez Walta, 2011)
Generation Hope #13-17 (pencils on #13-14 by Ibraim Roberson, #15 by Tim Green III, #16-17 by Takeshi Miyazawa, 2011-2012)
Gambit vol.5 #1-17 (pencils by Clay Mann, 2012-2013)
Other Marvel
Runaways Vol. 3 #10 (with co-writer Christopher Yost and art by Sara Pichelli & Emma Rios, Marvel Comics, 2009)
Steve Rogers: Super Soldier Annual #1 (pencils by Ibraim Roberson, 2011)
Namor: The First Mutant Annual #1 (pencils by Max Fiumara, 2011)
Captain America & Bucky #625-628 (with co-plotter Ed Brubaker and art by Francesco Francavilla, 2011-2012)
A+X #3 (Hawkeye + Gambit story, with pencils by Billy Tan, 2012)
Superior Foes of Spider-Man #10, 2014
All-New Inhumans #1-12 (pencils by Stefano Caselli, 2015-2016)
Amazing Spider-Man Annual and #25 (2016-2017)
Vault of Spiders #1 (Savage Spider-Man story, 2018)

Image Comics
Thief of Thieves #8-13 (with co-writer Robert Kirkman and art by Shawn Martinbrough, Image Comics/Skybound, 2012)
CBLDF Liberty Annual #5, story "Last Rights" with art by Takeshi Miyazawa, Image Comics, 2012)
The End Times Of Bram & Ben #1-4, (with co-writer / co-creator Jim Festante and art by Rem Broo, Image Comics, 2013)
Evolution #1-18, (with co-writers Joseph Keatinge and Christopher Sebela and art by Joe Infurnari, Image Comics, 2013)

Valiant Comics
Quantum and Woody #1-12, (with art by Tom Fowler, 2013-2014)
Quantum and Woody: Goat #0 (with art by Tom Fowler, 2014)
The Delinquents #1-4, (with co-writer Fred Van Lente and art by Kano (comics), 2014)
Valiant-Sized Quantum and Woody #1, (with co-writer Tim Siedell and art by Pere Pérez, 2014)
Quantum and Woody Must Die! #1-4, (with art by Steve Lieber, 2015)
Unity #23-25, 2015

DC Comics
DC Holiday Special 2016 (Titans story, with art by Reilly Brown)
The Terrifics Annual (Tom Strong story, with art by Jose Luis, 2018)

BOOM! Studios
Kong of Skull Island #1-12, (with art by Carlos Magno, 2016-2017)
Adventure Time Comics #20, ("Epic Yard Sale" story, art by Christina Rose Chua, 2018)

IDW PublishingMy Little Pony: Friendship is Magic #51-53, (with art by Tony Fleecs, 2017), Holiday Special 2017 (art by Brenda Hickey), Holiday Special 2019 (art by Andy Price and Trish Forstner)Transformers: Bumblebee - Win If You Dare graphic novel (with art by Marcelo Ferriera, 2018)Transformers / My Little Pony - Friendship In Disguise #1-4, (with art by Tony Fleecs, 2020)Transformers / My Little Pony - The Magic of Cybertron #1-4, (with art by Jack Lawrence, 2021)Voyage to the Stars #1-4, (with art by Connie Daidone, 2020-2021)

ONI PressRick and Morty: Corporate Assets (with art by Jarrett Williams, 2022)Rick and Morty Presents - Mr. Meeseeks (with co-writer Jim Festante, art by CJ Cannon, 2019)Aggretsuko: Meet Her Friends #3 (with art by Megan Huang, 2021)

Dark Horse ComicsSurvival Street (co-written / co-created with Jim Festante, with art by Abylay Kussainov, 2022)

Insight EditionsThe Official Rick and Morty Cookbook'' (with August Craig, 2022)

References

External links
James Asmus Official Site
James Asmus profile on Comic Vine
Podcast Interview with James Asmus at Scripts & Scribes

Living people
Year of birth missing (living people)
Writers from Cleveland
American male comedians
Place of birth missing (living people)
Comedians from Ohio